Stigmella dryadella is a moth of the family Nepticulidae. It is found from Fennoscandia and northern Russia to the Pyrenees and Italy, and from Ireland to Romania.

The wingspan is 4.5-5.5 mm.

The larvae feed on Dryas octopetala. They mine the leaves of their host plant. The mine consists of a narrow corridor, descending towards the base of the leaf while following the leaf margin. Later, the corridor reverses its direction, and widens into a blotch that may occupy half of the leaf. The frass is concentrated in the corridor as a broad central ribbon and is broadly scattered in the blotch.

External links
Fauna Europaea
bladmineerders.nl
Swedish moths
 Stigmella dryadella images at  Consortium for the Barcode of Life
lepiforum.de
insecta.pro

Nepticulidae
Moths of Europe
Moths described in 1868